Horace Francis (1821-1894) was a British architect, who often worked with his elder brother, fellow architect Frederick John Francis (1818-1896)

Notable buildings
 Elizabethan Ragged School, Fulham, London (1855)
 St Elphin's Church, Warrington (1867)
 London & County Bank, High Street, Oxford (1867–68)

References

1821 births
1894 deaths
19th-century English architects